Hilarographa ribbei is a species of moth of the family Tortricidae. It is found in Panama.

The forewings have a brownish ground colour with eight oblique, creamish dorsal lines.

References

Moths described in 1877
Hilarographini